Alvin Smith (born 23 September 1951) is a Bahamian politician who was the Speaker of the House of Assembly from 2007 to 2012. He was the MP for the Constituency of North Eleuthera from 1997 to 2012.

Biography 
Smith was born in Hatchet Bay, a town on the island of Eleuthera.  He obtained a Bachelor's degree in Education from the University of Miami, and subsequently spent 24 years as a teacher and a trustee of the Bahamas Union of Teachers.  He entered politics in 1992 as a member of the Free National Movement, where he was engaged in several appointments which included Parliamentary Secretary in the Ministry of Education in 1995, and again in 2001. In 1997 he was elected to the House of Assembly as MP for the constituency of North Eleuthera. In May 2002 Smith was re-elected as Member of Parliament for North Eleuthera and from May 2002 to November 2005 served as Official Leader of the Free National Movement in Parliament. Following the national elections in May 2007, Smith was appointed as Speaker of the House of Assembly by the new FNM led Government.  He served as Speaker until 2012.

From 2017 to 2020, Smith was the Bahamas High Commissioner to Canada.

References 

1951 births
Speakers of the House of Assembly of the Bahamas
University of Miami School of Education alumni
Bahamian schoolteachers
Free National Movement politicians
Members of the House of Assembly of the Bahamas
Living people
People from Eleuthera
20th-century Bahamian politicians
21st-century Bahamian politicians